A licked finish is a hallmark of French academic art. It refers to the process of smoothing the surface quality of a painting so that the presence of the artist's hand is no longer visible. It was codified by the French Academy in the eighteenth century in order to distinguish 'professional' art from that produced by amateurs.

Jean Auguste Dominique Ingres summed up the academic technique: "The brushstroke, as accomplished as it may be, should not be visible: otherwise, it prevents the illusion, immobilizes everything. Instead of the object represented, it calls attention to the process: instead of the thought, it betrays the hand."

The rejection of the licked finish in favour of visible brushstrokes is one of the hallmarks of Impressionism.

References

Painting techniques